Potassium voltage-gated channel subfamily E member 2 (KCNE2), also known as MinK-related peptide 1 (MiRP1), is a protein that in humans is encoded by the KCNE2 gene on chromosome 21. MiRP1 is a voltage-gated potassium channel accessory subunit (beta subunit) associated with Long QT syndrome. It is ubiquitously expressed in many tissues and cell types. Because of this and its ability to regulate multiple different ion channels, KCNE2 exerts considerable influence on a number of cell types and tissues. Human KCNE2 is a member of the five-strong family of human KCNE genes. KCNE proteins contain a single membrane-spanning region, extracellular N-terminal and intracellular C-terminal. KCNE proteins have been widely studied for their roles in the heart and in genetic predisposition to inherited cardiac arrhythmias. The KCNE2 gene also contains one of 27 SNPs associated with increased risk of coronary artery disease. More recently, roles for KCNE proteins in a variety of non-cardiac tissues have also been explored.

Discovery 

Steve Goldstein (then at Yale University) used a BLAST search strategy, focusing on KCNE1 sequence stretches known to be important for function, to identify related expressed sequence tags (ESTs) in the NCBI database. Using sequences from these ESTs, KCNE2, 3 and 4 were cloned.

Tissue distribution 

KCNE2 protein is most readily detected in the choroid plexus epithelium, gastric parietal cells, and thyroid epithelial cells. KCNE2 is also expressed in atrial and ventricular cardiomyocytes, the pancreas, pituitary gland, and lung epithelium. In situ hybridization data suggest that KCNE2 transcript may also be expressed in various neuronal populations.

Structure

Gene 
The KCNE2 gene resides on chromosome 21 at the band 21q22.11 and contains 2 exons. Since human KCNE2 is located ~79 kb from KCNE1 and in the opposite direction, KCNE2 is proposed to originate from a gene duplication event.

Protein 
This protein belongs to the potassium channel KCNE family and is one five single transmembrane domain voltage-gated potassium (Kv) channel ancillary subunits. KCNE2 is composed of three major domains: the N-terminal domain, the transmembrane domain, and the C-terminal domain. The N-terminal domain protrudes out of the extracellular side of the cell membrane and is, thus, soluble in the aqueous environment. Meanwhile, the transmembrane and C-terminal domains are lipid-soluble to enable the protein to incorporate into the cell membrane. The C-terminal faces the intracellular side of the membrane and may share a putative PKC phosphorylation site with other KCNE proteins.

Like other KCNEs, KCNE2 forms a heteromeric complex with the Kv α subunits.

Function

Choroid plexus epithelium 
KCNE2 protein is most readily detected in the choroid plexus epithelium, at the apical side. KCNE2 forms complexes there with the voltage-gated potassium channel α subunit, Kv1.3.  In addition, KCNE2 forms reciprocally regulating tripartite complexes in the choroid plexus epithelium with the KCNQ1 α subunit and the sodium-dependent myo-inositol transporter, SMIT1.  Kcne2-/- mice exhibit increased seizure susceptibility, reduced immobility time in the tail suspension test, and reduced cerebrospinal fluid myo-inositol content, compared to wild-type littermates.  Mega-dosing of myo-inositol reverses all these phenotypes, suggesting a link between myo-inositol and the seizure susceptibility and behavioral alterations in Kcne2-/- mice.

Gastric epithelium 

KCNE2 is also highly expressed in parietal cells of the gastric epithelium, also at the apical side. In these cells, KCNQ1-KCNE2 K+ channels, which are constitutively active, provide a conduit to return K+ ions back to the stomach lumen. The K+ ions enter the parietal cell through the gastric H+/K+-ATPase, which swaps them for protons as it acidifies the stomach. While KCNQ1 channels are inhibited by low extracellular pH, KCNQ1-KCNE2 channels activity is augmented by extracellular protons, an ideal characteristic for their role in parietal cells.

Thyroid epithelium 

KCNE2 forms constitutively active K+ channels with KCNQ1 in the basolateral membrane of thyroid epithelial cells. Kcne2-/- mice exhibit hypothyroidism, particularly apparent during gestation or lactation. KCNQ1-KCNE2 is required for optimal iodide uptake into the thyroid by the basolateral sodium iodide symporter (NIS).  Iodide is required for biosynthesis of thyroid hormones.

Heart 
KCNE2 was originally discovered to regulate hERG channel function. KCNE2 decreases macroscopic and unitary current through hERG, and speeds hERG deactivation. hERG generates IKr, the most prominent repolarizing current in human ventricular cardiomyocytes. hERG, and IKr, are highly susceptible to block by a range of structurally diverse pharmacological agents. This property means that many drugs or potential drugs have the capacity to impair human ventricular repolarization, leading to drug-induced long QT syndrome. KCNE2 may also regulate hyperpolarization-activated, cyclic-nucleotide-gated (HCN) pacemaker channels in human heart and in the hearts of other species, as well as the Cav1.2 voltage-gated calcium channel.

In mice, mERG and KCNQ1, another Kv α subunit regulated by KCNE2, are neither influential nor highly expressed in adult ventricles. However, Kcne2-/- mice exhibit QT prolongation at baseline at 7 months of age, or earlier if provoked with a QT-prolonging agent such as sevoflurane. This is because KCNE2 is a promiscuous regulatory subunit that forms complexes with Kv1.5 and with Kv4.2 in adult mouse ventricular myocytes. KCNE2 increases currents though Kv4.2 channels and slows their inactivation. KCNE2 is required for Kv1.5 to localize to the intercalated discs of mouse ventricular myocytes. Kcne2 deletion in mice reduces the native currents generated in ventricular myocytes by Kv4.2 and Kv1.5, namely Ito and IKslow, respectively.

Clinical Significance

Gastric epithelium 
Kcne2-/- mice exhibit achlorhydria, gastric hyperplasia, and mis-trafficking of KCNQ1 to the parietal cell basal membrane. The mis-trafficking occurs because KCNE3 is upregulated in the parietal cells of Kcne2-/- mice, and hijacks KCNQ1, taking it to the basolateral membrane. When both Kcne2 and Kcne3 are germline-deleted in mice, KCNQ1 traffics to the parietal cell apical membrane but the gastric phenotype is even worse than for Kcne2-/- mice, emphasizing that KCNQ1 requires KCNE2 co-assembly for functional attributes other than targeting in parietal cells. Kcne2-/- mice also develop gastritis cystica profunda and gastric neoplasia. Human KCNE2 downregulation is also observed in sites of gastritis cystica profunda and gastric adenocarcinoma.

Thyroid epithelium 

Positron emission tomography data show that with KCNE2, 124I uptake by the thyroid is impaired. Kcne2 deletion does not impair organification of iodide once it has been taken up by NIS. Pups raised by Kcne2-/- dams are particularly severely affected becauset they receive less milk (hypothyroidism of the dams impairs milk ejection), the milk they receive is deficient in T4, and they themselves cannot adequately transport iodide into the thyroid. Kcne2-/- pups exhibit stunted growth, alopecia, cardiomegaly and reduced cardiac ejection fraction, all of which are alleviated by thyroid hormone supplementation of pups or dams. Surrogating Kcne2-/- pups with Kcne2+/+ dams also alleviates these phenotypes, highlighting the influence of maternal genotype in this case.

Heart 

As observed for hERG mutations, KCNE2 loss-of-function mutations are associated with inherited long QT syndrome, and hERG-KCNE2 channels carrying the mutations show reduced activity compared to wild-type channels.  In addition, some KCNE2 mutations and also more common polymorphisms are associated with drug-induced long QT syndrome.  In several cases, specific KCNE2 sequence variants increase the susceptibility to hERG-KCNE2 channel inhibition by the drug that precipitated the QT prolongation in the patient from which the gene variant was isolated. Long QT syndrome predisposes to potentially lethal ventricular cardiac arrhythmias including torsades de pointe, which can degenerate into ventricular fibrillation and sudden cardiac death. Moreover, KCNE2 gene variation can disrupt HCN1-KCNE2 channel function and this may potentially contribute to cardiac arrhythmogenesis. KCNE2 is also associated with familial atrial fibrillation, which may involve excessive KCNQ1-KCNE2 current caused by KCNE2 gain-of-function mutations. 

Recently, a battery of extracardiac effects were discovered in Kcne2-/- mice that may contribute to cardiac arrhythmogenesis in Kcne2-/- mice and could potentially contribute to human cardiac arrhythmias if similar effects are observed in human populations. Kcne2 deletion in mice causes anemia, glucose intolerance, dyslipidemia, hyperkalemia and elevated serum angiotensin II. Some or all of these might contribute to predisposition to sudden cardiac death in Kcne2-/- mice in the context of myocardial ischemia and post-ischemic arrhythmogenesis.

Clinical Marker 
A multi-locus genetic risk score study based on a combination of 27 loci, including the KCNE2 gene, identified individuals at increased risk for both incident and recurrent coronary artery disease events, as well as an enhanced clinical benefit from statin therapy. The study was based on a community cohort study (the Malmo Diet and Cancer study) and four additional randomized controlled trials of primary prevention cohorts (JUPITER and ASCOT) and secondary prevention cohorts (CARE and PROVE IT-TIMI 22).

See also 
 Voltage-gated potassium channel
 KCNE1
 KCNE3
 KCNQ1

Notes

References

Further reading

External links 
  GeneReviews/NIH/NCBI/UW entry on Romano-Ward Syndrome
 
 
 
 

Ion channels
Articles containing video clips